Olga Lugina (born 8 January 1974) is a Ukrainian former professional tennis player. She competed in the Fed Cup a number of times, from 1993 to 1995. 

Lugina won two doubles titles on the WTA Tour. She also won one singles title and ten doubles titles on the ITF Circuit in her career. On 27 April 1998, she reached her best singles ranking of world No. 96. On 31 October 1994, she peaked at No. 45 in the doubles rankings.

Lugina retired from tennis tour 1999.

WTA career finals

Doubles: 3 (2 titles, 1 runner-up)

ITF Circuit finals

Singles: 5 (1–4)

Doubles: 17 (10–7)

References

1974 births
Living people 
Ukrainian female tennis players
Soviet female tennis players